The I'm Not Dead Tour was the third concert tour by American singer-songwriter Pink. Launched in support of her fourth studio album, I'm Not Dead (2006) the tour reached Europe, North America, Australia, Africa, and Asia.

Background
After performing several promotional shows throughout North America and Europe, Pink announced her tour in the spring of 2006. The "I'm Not Dead Tour" began in North America in nightclubs and theatres. Pink explained, "Small gigs, that's where it's at [...] You can feel everyone's sweat, it's just so close and intimate. It's stinky, it's smoky, it's good." Pink continued her tour into Europe and Australia, playing predominantly in arenas. As her album gained momentum in the US, she joined Justin Timberlake as the opening act on his FutureSex/LoveShow tour at select venues in the US. Pink returned to Europe during the summer of 2007, playing open air/amphitheater festivals. She concluded her tour in South Africa. The tour became one of the most successful tours in both 2006 and 2007. In Australia, she became the most successful female artist during that time. The Australian leg grossed about $42 million and was Pink's most successful tour until her Funhouse Tour in 2009.

Opening acts
 Marion Raven (Germany—Leg 1)
 Gary "Mudbone" Cooper and Nadirah X(United Kingdom & Northern Ireland—Leg 1)
 The Coronas (United Kingdom & Northern Ireland—Leg 2) (select venues)
 Infernal (Odense)
 The Androids (Australia)
 Lili (Europe—Leg 1) (select venues)
 Sorgente (Europe—Leg 1) (select venues)
 Lââm (Paris)
 Kamera (Europe—Leg 1) (select venues)
 Vanilla Ninja (Europe—Leg 1) (select venues)
 Matt Nathanson – select dates

Setlist

{{hidden
| headercss = background: #ccccff; font-size: 100%; width: 65%;
| contentcss = text-align: left; font-size: 100%; width: 75%;
| header = European First Leg, Oceanian Leg, Asian Leg and African Leg
| content =
"'Cuz I Can"
"Trouble"
"Just like a Pill"
"Who Knew"
"I'm Not Dead"
"Lady Marmalade" 
"Stupid Girls" (contains an excerpt from  "Most Girls")
"There You Go"
"God Is a DJ" 
"Fingers"
"Family Portrait"
"Redemption Song"
"The One That Got Away"
"Dear Mr. President"
"What's Up"
"U + Ur Hand"
"18 Wheeler"
"Don't Let Me Get Me"
"Leave Me Alone (I'm Lonely)"
Encore
"Nobody Knows"
"Get The Party Started"
}}

Tour dates

Cancellations and rescheduled shows

Box office score data

References

External links 
 Official site
 Official Australian site
 Official UK site

Pink (singer) concert tours
2007 concert tours
2006 concert tours
Concert tours of Africa
Concert tours of Asia
Concert tours of Australia
Concert tours of Canada
Concert tours of Europe
Concert tours of France
Concert tours of Germany
Concert tours of Ireland
Concert tours of New Zealand
Concert tours of North America
Concert tours of Oceania
Concert tours of the United Kingdom
Concert tours of the United States
Concert tours of South Africa